(also known as Skudeneshamn or simply Skudenes) is a town in Karmøy municipality in Rogaland county, Norway.  It is located on the southernmost tip of the island of Karmøy at the entrance to the Boknafjorden and Karmsundet strait. The town is part of the traditional district of Haugaland. The town was an independent municipality due to its status as a ladested from 1858 until 1965.

This makes Skudeneshavn one of the smallest towns in Norway (Kolvereid, with 1,470 inhabitants is the smallest). In 1990, it won second prize in NORTRA's competition for Norway's Best Preserved Small Town.

History
The village of Skudeneshavn was declared to be a ladested (port town) on 10 February 1858. Since towns were not allowed to be part of a rural municipality, Skudeneshavn was removed from the municipality of Skudenes, and it was established as its own urban municipality. Initially, Skudeneshavn municipality had 1,209 residents. During the 1960s, there were many municipal mergers across Norway due to the work of the Schei Committee. On 1 January 1965, the town-municipality of Skudeneshavn was merged into the newly formed municipality of Karmøy (along with Skudenes, Avaldsnes, Stangaland, Kopervik, and Torvastad).  Prior to the merger, Skudeneshavn had 1,275 residents.  At the time of the merger, Skudeneshavn lost its status as a town (ladested). In 1996, after the law on towns had been changed, the municipality of Karmøy declared Skudeneshavn to be a town once again.

Government
From 1858 through 1964, Skudeneshavn was a municipality which was responsible for primary education (through 10th grade), outpatient health services, senior citizen services, unemployment and other social services, zoning, economic development, and municipal roads.  The municipality was governed by a municipal council of elected representatives, which in turn elects a mayor.

Municipal council
The municipal council  of Skudeneshavn was made up of 21 representatives that were elected to four year terms.  The party breakdown of the final municipal council was as follows:

Attractions
Skudeneshavn's old town (Gamle Skudeneshavn), consisting of 225 wooden houses/boathouses, is regarded as one of the best preserved in Europe. In 2004, it was voted Norway's "Summer Town" by listeners to NRK Radio's Reiseradioen programme.

Each year the "Skudeneshavn International Literature and Culture festival" (SILK festival) is held on the first weekend of November.

Skudefestival
Every year, Skudeneshavn hosts a "boating" festival known as Skudefestivalen. It usually runs for four days (Thurs, Fri, Sat and Sun) at the end of June or beginning of July (it is a 'moveable' date). The festival is the largest gathering of coastal culture in Western Norway, with boats of all categories - old wooden boats, vintage boats, modern boats, sailing boats, tall ships - the town is full of life around the harbour - both on land and on water. Markets stalls are set up in the Town Square. Craftsmen demonstrate handcrafts from olden days connected to sea and shipping. Boat builders, ship models, old engines. An art exhibition in Søragadå - the main and narrow street in "Old Skudeneshavn" is held with a new festival artist chosen every year. Visitors can see the exhibitions in "Bytunet" in the old part of town. Entertainment is provided in the daytime - and in the evenings in the festival tent featuring national and international artists and in the many sea houses Celtic music, blues and middle-of the road pop. Travelling amusement rides and arcades usually time their visits to coincide with this popular festival, providing extra enjoyment for younger children and teenagers. Every year about 35,000 people visit the festival and it gathers more than 600 boats. The festival in 2017 was between 29 June - 2 July and is the 24th festival. The festival in 2018 is between 5 and 8 July.

See also
List of former municipalities of Norway

References

External links 
Skudeneshavn.com

Karmøy
Populated places in Rogaland
Cities and towns in Norway
Former municipalities of Norway
1858 establishments in Norway
1965 disestablishments in Norway
1996 establishments in Norway